Richard Klier (born 1891, date of death unknown) was a Czechoslovak sports shooter. He competed in the team clay pigeon event at the 1924 Summer Olympics.

References

External links
 

1891 births
Year of death missing
Czechoslovak male sport shooters
Olympic shooters of Czechoslovakia
Shooters at the 1924 Summer Olympics
Place of birth missing